Kanraj is a town and union council of Uthal Tehsil, Lasbela District, Balochistan, Pakistan.
Kanraj region is enriched with minerals and other resources. Its also called Kanrach.
Access to Kanraj is restricted for tourist, restriction on hunting as the area is rich in wildlife including foxes, owls, ibexes, rabbits, spring water fishes and much more. The land of waterfalls and rivers.

Waterfalls
There are quite few waterfalls in Kanraj area.

Location
About 225+ kilometers from Karachi, and about 125 kilometers North East of Winder.

References

Union councils of Lasbela District
Populated places in Lasbela District